The Masters School (colloquially known as Masters), is a private, coeducational boarding school and day college preparatory school located in Dobbs Ferry, New York.  Its  campus is located north of New York City in the Hudson Valley in Westchester County.  It was founded as an all-girls private school in 1877 by Eliza Bailey Masters, and first admitted boys in 1996.

History

Early history 

The school was founded in 1877 by Eliza Bailey Masters as the ″Misses Masters' Boarding and Day School for Young Ladies and Children.″ Eliza Masters, known as "Miss Lizzie" by her students had been born in 1845 to a devout Methodist family. Never married, she was inspired by the loss of her brother, the teacher Jeremiah Wilbur Masters, to typhoid fever to start the school. Following her father's death in 1874, Eliza Masters founded the school at Wilde House, also called Kirk Knoll, near the school's present-day location. James Jennings McComb, a cotton magnate and philanthropist, moved to Dobbs Ferry in the 1880s to be closer to his children. He purchased a 23-acre parcel close to Wilde House from one Dr. Ryder, and commissioned a mansion, called Estherwood in honor of his second wife, Esther Wood, on it. (The mansion was completed in 1891.) At the time, the school, which had a burgeoning student body, was considering move to Irvington to the estate of Cyrus West Field. McComb convinced Eliza Masters to stay in Dobbs Ferry by purchasing 11 acres south of Estherwood, building First and Second Houses on them in 1883, and leasing them to the school for a nominal rent. The school's faculty and 75 students moved to McComb's estate in the fall of 1883. In 1888, McComb built a Third House as a school building with an assembly hall, classrooms, a gym, a studio, and a laboratory. A Fourth House, devoted to the study of domestic science, was constructed in 1891. After McComb's death in 1901, Eliza Masters purchased his estate for the equivalent of $12 million.

After Eliza Master's death in 1921, her sister, Sarah Wilbur Masters, succeeded her as headmistress, serving alongside Mary Comstock Strong. The School was incorporated in 1911 and Masters Hall, designed by Ralph Adams Cram, was completed in 1921. Many of the school's clubs, including the Missionary Society (today known as MISH), the Dobbs Athletic Association, Glee Club, and Phoenix (the school's acting society), came about during the early 20th century.

The school taught English, French, Latin, music, art, the Bible, moral philosophy, astronomy, botany, mathematics, domestic science, and etiquette. While it was secular, Masters had a religious tone; it catered exclusively to female students.

The finishing school had a series of unusual rules that has since been removed from the school's handbook. One of the most famous rules is that the students were expected to eat bananas with knives and forks. One account even states that the girls were expected to submit weekly diaries of their bowel movements, but that their entries were mainly fictional. The school's loosely Puritanical ideology is also apparent in the school's old regulations. According to Aimee MacRae's account of her brief time at the school, a distance between men in the town and schoolgirls was expected by Miss Masters, "Never sit on the same sofa with a man; the devil sits between you."

Later years 
In 1996, due to under-enrollment, the school became co-educational, opening itself to male students for the first time.

Student body 
The Masters School has over 670 students in grades 5–12. The school is co-educational as of February 2020, Masters students come from 20 states and over 30 countries. In addition, up to eighty students are international.

Faculty 
Over 70% of the faculty have advanced degrees. The average class size is 14 students.

Campus 
The school's wooded 96-acre campus is on a hilltop in Dobbs Ferry, a historic village with a sloping geography and waterfront on the Hudson River. A five-minute walk from the campus brings students down to the heart of town, and a train ride to New York City that takes anywhere from 35 to 50 minutes.

Located in the center of campus, two dormitories for boys and three dormitories for girls accommodate more than 150 upper school American and international students. Both sets of dorms have outdoor space with grills for use in the warmer months as well as phones, wireless internet connections, and washers and dryers. There are dorm common rooms containing a TV and a state-of-the-art kitchen.

The campus includes Estherwood, a late 19th-century mansion that is the only châteauesque building in Westchester County. It and its carriage house are listed on the National Register of Historic Places. It houses faculty in apartments on the upper floors, and the first floor and grounds offer a unique setting for school parties and programs. Student chamber ensembles perform in Estherwood and, each year, drama students present one-act plays in one of the mansion's rooms.

Facilities 
 Masters Hall, which dates back to 1921, is the academic hub of the School. It was renovated in 1972 following a fire and again in 2005. The building contains the 30,000-volume Pittsburgh Library and McKnight Reading Room; Upper School academic classrooms with Harkness tables and ceiling-mounted projectors; a digital media lab, language lab, lecture hall, computer language lab, and administration and faculty offices.
 Morris Hall is the school's science and technology center. The building houses rooms with Harkness tables and fully equipped science laboratories for teaching biology, physics, environmental science, chemistry, and one semester seminar style courses such as forensics; faculty offices; a special lab for independent research; and two dedicated labs for the middle school.
 The Middle School building opened in January 2005. It houses fifteen classrooms; the Doc Wilson Hall; common areas on each floor for informal meetings and socializing; an art classroom and kiln; and a music room with keyboards.
 Cameron A. Mann Dining Hall is the school's dining hall.
 Claudia Boettcher Theater is the 450-seat theater connected to Masters Hall. It is also the school's gathering place where the 10th, 11th, and 12th grades and some 9th graders meet for morning meeting, while the overflow of the freshman class watch the meeting on livestream.
 Strayer Hall houses one of the school's gymnasium, weight room, music center, and dance studio.
 The Art Studio is a two-story art studio adjacent to the theater. A digital media lab and darkroom are located on the other side of the building. It is connected to Masters Hall.
 The Maureen Fonseca Center for Athletics and Arts, frequently referred to as the "FC," is named for former Head of School Dr. Maureen Fonseca, and opened in the fall of 2015. It is a 75,000 ft2 building featuring a fencing salon, a six-lane NYSAIS compliant swimming pool, four squash courts, a three lane indoor track, a gymnasium with a regulation basketball court, two practice basketball courts and two volleyball courts, a cardio room, trainers room with whirlpool for conditioning and therapy, two sets of locker rooms, art gallery, experimental theater and adjoining green room, a recital hall, two dance studios, photography and video studio, media arts lab, various rehearsal spaces for artists, and the Davis Cafe.

Athletics 
The school offers the following sports each season:

Fall
 Cross-country
 Soccer
 Field hockey
 Volleyball
 Tennis

Winter
 Basketball
 Fencing (epee, foil, and sabre)
 Indoor track
 Squash
 Swimming

Spring
 Lacrosse
 Baseball
 Softball
 Tennis
 Golf
 Track and field

Academics and curriculum 
The minimum course load each year includes five major courses. Graduation requirements include four years of English, three years of a foreign language, three years of mathematics (through at least precalculus), three years of science, three years of history (including U.S. history), religion (a semester major course), 9th Grade Seminar, 11th Grade Health/Public Speaking, 1.5 years (3 semesters) of performing or visual art, three seasons of a team sport, and P.E. (as mandated by the NYS board of Education).

The school offers honors sections in the sciences, mathematics, and languages. Advanced Placement courses are offered in all of the academic departments.

Nearly all classes at Masters are designed around the Harkness method, a discussion-based teaching method designed to encourage active participation in education, and help students develop listening and speaking skills. To facilitate this method, all classrooms are fitted with a large oval Harkness table. All of the tables have pull-out leaves built into the table for administering exams.

Tower is the award-winning student newspaper of The Masters School. It is published approximately seven times a year on print as well as online, including one annual satirical issue known as Pravda. Their most notable achievements include the gold medal by the Columbia Scholastic Press Association (CSPA) in 2012 and 2013 as well as two others from CSPA for their Special Parkland Edition, published in April 2018.

Notable Programmes

Theatre 

 The Masters Department of Performing Arts (DoPA) stages three productions each year—a dramatic play in the fall, a musical in the winter, and student-directed one-act plays in the spring. Members of Phoenix, the school's honorary drama society, stage their own productions throughout the year. Phoenix Coffee House offers "open mic" opportunities for performers, poets, and musicians in the community.

Music 

 The music program offers classes and private lessons during the school day, one of the most popular being the school's chorus, known as Glee Club. Smaller A Capella groups are also popular. Students may participate in any of three groups: The Naturals, an all-male group; Dohters, all-female; and Dobbs 16, a coed group. Dobbs 16 has won competitions including the Northeast regional of the National Championship of High School A Capella 2005. The group toured China in the spring of 2008 and went on The Tyra Banks Show in fall 2009. The host of instrumental and vocal groups includes a community orchestra and a jazz ensemble, plus bands and combos that offer opportunities for musical expression.

Dance 

 The dance program offers classes during the day and three audition-only dance companies. Muse and Urban Connection perform modern/ballet and hip-hop, respectively. The school also contains audition-based dance clubs, including K-Pop Cover Dance Club (KODE). The Masters School Dance Company performs twice a year.

Innovation and Entrepreneurship Center (IEC) 

 The IEC (as it is often referred to) offers a four-year integrated engineering/computer science program consisting of Introduction to Engineering Design, Principles of Engineering, AP Computer Science Principles, and AP Computer Science Applications. These programs give the student the opportunity to earn college credit from PLTW/Rochester Institute of Technology and The College Board. The department also offers Design Thinking and Social Entrepreneurship where students learn business skills with a focus on creative design. Zetetics, the after school program of the IEC consists of:
 History Bowl
 Engineering and Robotics
 Mathematical Modeling
 Computer Science
 Cybersecurity Team

All programs within Zetetics are highly regarded in their respective leagues and have won many awards.

Notable alumni and faculty 

Alumni:
 Hazel, Lady Lavery – artist, second wife of Irish painter Sir John Lavery
 Marin Alsop – conductor
 Michele Roberts – lawyer and President of National Basketball Players Association
 David Gelb – director
 Neltje Blanchan – scientific historian
 Sam Coffey – professional soccer player
 Kara DioGuardi – singer-songwriter
 Martha F. Gerry – heiress
 Alex Pall – member of The Chainsmokers
 Betsy Gotbaum – former New York City Public Advocate
 Mary Lea Johnson Richards – Johnson & Johnson heiress
 Nancy Kissinger – wife of former U.S. Secretary of State Henry Kissinger
 Marie-Chantal, Crown Princess of Greece – Crown Princess of Greece and Denmark
 Suzanne Paxton – 1996 Olympic foil fencer
 Susan Cheever – author
 Victoria Fuller – artist and sculptor
 Jill Krementz – photographer
 Marie Jenney Howe – suffragist and feminist
 Margaret Storrs Grierson – archivist and philosophy professor
 Helen Kirkpatrick – war correspondent during Second World War
 Alice Pearce – actress
 Ruth Rowland Nichols – aviator
 Edith Chapin – NPR National News Editor
 Elizabeth Post – etiquette writer
 Mary Jayne Gold – heiress and humanitarian
 Mary Scranton – former First Lady of Pennsylvania (1963–1967)
 Ruth Hanna McCormick – U.S. Representative from Illinois, 1929–1931
Jay Washington – Filipino-American professional basketball player in Philippine Basketball Association
Carey Winfrey – former editor-in-chief of Cuisine, American Health and Smithsonian magazines
 Ilyasah Shabazz – motivational speaker and daughter of Malcolm X
 Elizabeth Walker – actress
 Flynn Berry – author
 Rachel Rose (artist) – artist
 Paget Brewster – actress
 Henry Williams – political activist, chief of staff of the Mike Gravel 2020 presidential campaign
 David Oks – political activist, manager of the Mike Gravel 2020 presidential campaign
 Virginia Wright – prominent art collector, philanthropist in the Pacific Northwest

Faculty:
 Grete Sultan – pianist (former)
 Gwendolyn Bradley – soprano
 Jessica Boevers – stage actress

References

External links 

 Official website
 CITYterm at the Masters School

Preparatory schools in New York (state)
Boarding schools in New York (state)
Educational institutions established in 1877
Private high schools in Westchester County, New York
Private middle schools in Westchester County, New York
1877 establishments in New York (state)